Ryan George Henson Loft (born 14 September 1997) is an English professional footballer who plays as a striker for Bristol Rovers.

Early and personal life
Born in Gravesend, Loft attended Northfleet Technology College, where he was a high jump champion.

Career
After playing for Dartford and Ebbsfleet United, Loft joined Tottenham Hotspur for the 2013–14 season. He moved to Braintree Town in March 2016 on a 'work experience' deal, He signed on loan for Stevenage in January 2017, and for Exeter City in January 2018. He was released by Tottenham at the end of the 2017–18 season. In July 2018 Loft signed a two-year contract with Leicester City. He moved on loan to Carlisle United in August 2019.

He was released by Leicester at the end of the 2019–20 season.

In August 2020 he signed for Scunthorpe United on a two-year contract.

Bristol Rovers
On 4 January 2022, Loft joined fellow League Two side Bristol Rovers for an undisclosed fee, signing a two-and-a-half year deal with the club. He made his debut in a 2–0 win over Hartlepool United. Loft opened his account for the club on 18 April 2022, scoring the third goal in injury time to secure a vital win for Rovers over promotion rivals Port Vale, lifting the ball over the onrushing Vale goalkeeper after being played through by Sam Finley. The season ended with a first career promotion for Loft, a 7–0 victory over Loft's former club Scunthorpe seeing Rovers overtake Northampton Town into the final automatic promotion place on goals scored.

Loft started the 2022–23 season by scoring five goals in a six-match spell through August to September 2022. Loft had impressed manager Joey Barton with his willingness to work for the team having returned to pre-season in fitter shape, becoming a permanent fixture in the starting line-up.

Career statistics

References

1997 births
Living people
Sportspeople from Gravesend, Kent
Footballers from Kent
English footballers
Association football forwards
Dartford F.C. players
Ebbsfleet United F.C. players
Tottenham Hotspur F.C. players
Braintree Town F.C. players
Stevenage F.C. players
Exeter City F.C. players
Leicester City F.C. players
Carlisle United F.C. players
Scunthorpe United F.C. players
Bristol Rovers F.C. players
English Football League players